"Million Dollar Abie" is the sixteenth episode of the seventeenth season of the American animated television series The Simpsons. It originally aired on the Fox network in the United States on April 2, 2006. This is the first episode to have a parody title of the film Million Dollar Baby, with the second being "Million Dollar Maybe" in season 21.

Plot
When it is announced that the commissioner of pro football Bud Armstrong wants to expand the league, Homer leads the charge to get the new franchise in Springfield. At first his family does not think he can do it, but Homer manages to put forth a surprisingly strong package for the Springfield Meltdowns and the new park, named the
Duff Beer Krusty Burger Buzz Cola Costington's Department Store Kwik-E-Mart Stupid Flanders Park.

The commissioner narrows down the choice of the two cities to either Springfield or Los Angeles. L.A. puts forth an anti-Springfield video hosted by Rob Reiner and features a song sung by celebrity impersonators that ends with them singing "Springfield Blows". All the owners decide that Springfield is the lesser of two evils (it does not hurt that the Rich Texan owns slums in Springfield and another owner snaps that she did not kill her husband and seize his team just to put a team in Los Angeles) and the Commissioner awards the new team to Springfield. The town gets "Meltmania" and "Downs syndrome", quickly builds Homer's new park, paints the town in the team colours (orange and purple) and changes all of the street names to football-related names (e.g. Two-Point Conversion Avenue, Off-Season Knee Surgery Blvd).

On the day when Springfield is officially announced as the new team, Commissioner Armstrong gets confused by all of the new street names and gets lost. He stops for directions at the Simpsons' house and is greeted by Grampa Simpson, who welcomes him in as he is busy watching Maggie. However, Grampa is watching a TV program about undercover burglars who act just as the Commissioner did (asking for a telephone and a bathroom and, sometimes, taking pictures of the children of the house - he was looking at one with Bart and Lisa when attacked), and sneaks up behind Armstrong and knocks him unconscious with a golf club. The rest of the family arrives home, disappointed that the commissioner did not show and is shocked to find him tied up in their living room. The commissioner furiously declares that neither he nor the League will ever return to Springfield, ending the Meltdowns' history before it began. Homer then gets angry at Grampa, not only for costing the town the entire team, but also for losing track of Maggie.

The entire town hates Grampa for his actions, and the expensive stadium has to be used for farmers' markets, with even his dentures refusing to smile at him. Grampa is depressed and decides to seek out a doctor called Dr. Egoyan who will help him commit suicide with a suicide booth called a "diePod". The doctor tells Grampa to reconsider, and Grampa decides that if anyone calls him in the next 24 hours, he will not go through with his plan. The call never comes and Grampa goes back to the clinic the next day. To make it a more peaceful experience they project in front of him, at his request, hippies being beaten up by police while music from the Glenn Miller Orchestra plays. Grampa comes very close to dying, but Chief Wiggum ends the procedure just in time, telling the doctor that voters have overturned Springfield's assisted-suicide law.

Grampa thinks he is dead and runs through the town, seeing "Hamburger Heaven" and a Charlie Chaplin impersonator. He soon learns that he is not dead, gets a new lease on life and decides to live without fear. Meanwhile, the city decides to turn the unused football stadium into an arena for bull fighting. Despite Lisa's protests, as they go against her vegetarianism, Grampa decides to become a matador. Grampa wins his first fight with a bull, but at home, Lisa tells Grampa that she wants him to stop hurting and killing animals. Grampa tells her that people are cheering him for his success, but Lisa tells him that she has always cheered for him until now. Grampa is not sure about that, but in the next fight he sees the bull that he is about to kill and decides to spare its life.

He releases all the bulls, which immediately start running through the streets of Springfield, causing a great deal of destruction and injuring everyone. One bull takes the elevator up to the press box, and attacks the announcer, who is a parody of Spanish-language soccer announcer Andres Cantor. Lisa is proud of Grampa and the two reconcile in two Lawnchair Larry flight type patio chairs, but they both become in danger by two bulls flying with balloons.

In the post-credits scene, a flashback shows that Abe was present at the House Un-American Activities Committee hearings. While he was only there to test out the microphone during preparation time, he names several individuals as members of the Communist Party before being escorted out of the room.

Cultural references
In the "Springfield Blows" music video, Jar Jar Binks, Michael Jackson, Keith Richards, Pete Townshend, Steven Spielberg, Roger Daltrey and  Freddy Krueger are seen.

The song "Nobody Loves You (When You're Down and Out)" by John Lennon is featured when Grampa becomes a town pariah.

When Grandpa decides to enlist medical help in an assisted suicide (via the "die-Pod"), he is given three options;  'instant death, slow-painful death & "Megadeath"', in reference to the  Heavy Metal band Megadeth.

The euthanasia machine, the "diePod" is named after the iPod and bears a physical resemblance to it.

The scene where Grandpa seeks assisted suicide is also a reference to the scene in the film Soylent Green where the character played by Edward G. Robinson seeks a similar fate.

During the montage showing Grampa's new lease on life, "Superman" by R.E.M. plays.

References

External links 
 

The Simpsons (season 17) episodes
2006 American television episodes
Television episodes about euthanasia